The 45th International Emmy Awards took place on November 20, 2017, at the New York Hilton Midtown in New York City and was hosted by Iranian-American comedian and actor Maz Jobrani. The award ceremony, presented by the International Academy of Television Arts and Sciences (IATAS), honors all TV programming produced and originally aired outside the United States.

Summary

Ceremony
Nominations for the 45th International Emmy Awards were announced on September 27, 2017, by the International Academy of Television Arts & Sciences (IATAS). There are 44 Nominees across 11 categories and 18 countries. Nominees come from: Argentina, Australia, Belgium, Brazil, Canada, Colombia, France, Germany, Japan, Mexico, the Netherlands, Norway, Philippines, South Africa, Thailand, Turkey, the United Kingdom, and the United States.

In addition to the presentation of the International Emmys for programming and performances, the International Academy presented one special award. Emilio Azcárraga Jean, chairman of the board, President and CEO of Grupo Televisa, the world's largest Spanish-language content provider and Mexico's largest broadcaster and pay television provider, received the Directorate Award.

Winners and nominees

References

External links 
 Official website

International Emmy Awards ceremonies
International
International